The Baltimore Streetcar Museum (BSM) is a 501(c)(3) nonprofit museum. It is located at 1911 Falls Road (MD 25) in Baltimore, Maryland. The museum is dedicated to preserving Baltimore's public transportation history, especially the streetcar era.

Exhibits and displays

Operating streetcars
During public operations, the Baltimore Streetcar Museum offers rides to visitors on various streetcars including:

Car #264 
United Railways and Electric Company convertible model built in 1900 by the Brownell Car Company. The car has hand brakes only.

Car #4533 
United Railways and Electric Company One-Man Safety model, built as a handbrake two-man car in 1904 by J. G. Brill Company, rebuilt by UR&E as a one-man safety car in 1924, rebuilt again by BTCo as a Company rail conductivity testing car and renumbered 3550, lasting in service until 1963; Returned to its 1924 appearance in a recent Museum rebuilding.

Car #6119 
United Railways and Electric Company Peter Witt streetcar model, built in 1930 by J. G. Brill Company. A predecessor of the PCC car and about equal to one in every respect;  In service until 1955.

Car #7407 
Baltimore Transit Company Presidents' Conference Committee (PCC) streetcar, built by the Pullman Company.  At present this is the only regularly operating Pullman PCC in any museum. This car was built in 1944, and became the very last streetcar to turn a revenue wheel for BTC on November 3, 1963.

Car #2168
Philadelphia SEPTA PCC streetcar placed in service at the Museum in September 2009. This car was built by the St. Louis Car Co. for the Philadelphia Transportation Company in 1947, and lasted in SEPTA service until 1992.

Car #1164 
United Railways and Electric Company 12-bench open Brill 22-A model, built in 1902 by J. G. Brill Company. This car is also handbrake only. as of winter 2018 this car is under Restoration, due to return to service in summer 2020.

Car #554 
Baltimore traction company car 554, a Brownell Car Company 9-bench open summer car built in 1896, this car is handbrake only, this car had a 5-year restoration completed in the summer of 2018.

Car #417 
Built by the Baltimore City Passenger Railway as a horse car, later re-built as a cable car trailer, and finally into an electric car in 1895, is the Museum's newest restoration.  This car operates on special occasions and is reported to be the oldest operating electric streetcar in America.

Santa's Streetcar 
In December, the Museum holds a "Santa's Streetcar" event on two weekends, decorating one of the streetcars in Christmas finery as Santa Claus welcomes children.

Machine shop
The machine shop at the Baltimore Streetcar Museum is one of the largest and well equipped shops of any streetcar museum in the United States. In many instances, parts for Baltimore Streetcar Museum and other museums are custom fabricated.

Library collection
The Baltimore Streetcar Museum houses the library collections of the Baltimore Streetcar Museum and the National Railway Historical Society (Baltimore Chapter), formally known as Maryland Rail Heritage Library.

Additional information 
The Museum's website has detailed information about its operational equipment, as well as vehicles awaiting restoration (see Collection Highlights). Also provided are illustrations of surviving Baltimore area sites from the city's once-extensive streetcar network.

Volunteer operating staff
The Museum's streetcar operations is handled by an all-volunteer staff, composed exclusively of Museum members. Training is provided by the Museum's Training Department during a formal eleven week educational program.  Recruitment is periodically advertised through the Museum's newsletter which all Museum members receive.

Museum rentals
The Baltimore Streetcar Museum is also available for private parties for children and adults alike. The BSM's Visitor Center facilities feature an auditorium, the "Trolley Theatre," streetcar rides, and tours of the carhouse, where visitors view other historical transit equipment, such as an 1859 horse car, a crane car, and an electric bus, known as a trackless trolley or trolleybus.

History
The Baltimore Streetcar Museum was founded as a nonprofit organization on June 8, 1966, by several members of the Baltimore Chapter of the National Railroad Historical Society. The City of Baltimore agreed to build the museum and lease it to the nonprofit organization for one dollar per year. The groundbreaking ceremony was held on November 4, 1967. Opening day was August 30, 1968.

The original Museum collection consisted of equipment used by the former United Railways and Electric Company and Baltimore Transit Company (BTCO) services, which was held for a short time, the Maryland Historical Society after Baltimore ceased streetcar service.  The collection was moved from what was at the time Robert E. Lee Park, near Lake Roland, in 1968 to the present Falls Road Maryland and Pennsylvania Railroad site and public operations began in July 1970. Before public operations could commence, many hours of volunteer work were necessary to build operating track and install overhead wire which, at first, provided only a short ride for visitors.

Over the years, the Museum has incrementally extended its line along Falls Road that includes now turning loops at the north and south ends of its line. Completion of the Museum's entire streetcar line was realized in October 2008 with the completion of its double tracking project, which took many years to complete. The track gauge continues to be the unique  one used by original Baltimore streetcar lines.

Streetcar service

A track providing service at the museum is identified by the Maryland Transit Administration as LocalLink 25.  At one time, the United Railways and Electric Company route was the Route 25 line on Falls Road, past the current site of the Museum.

See also
National Capital Trolley Museum (in Silver Spring, Maryland)
Baltimore City Passenger Railway
 Baltimore Light RailLink
 History of MTA Maryland
 United Railways and Electric Company

References

External links

Baltimore Streetcar Museum Machine Shop
Baltimore Streetcar Museum
National Railway Historical Society, Inc. (Baltimore Chapter)

Museums in Baltimore
Streetcars in Maryland
Transportation in Baltimore
Railroad museums in Maryland
Museums established in 1966
Remington, Baltimore
5 ft 4½ in gauge railways
1966 establishments in Maryland
Street railway museums in the United States
Heritage railroads in Maryland